Nicolás José Herranz (born 17 June 1994) is an Argentine professional footballer who plays as a centre back for Guillermo Brown.

Career
Herranz spent time in the youth system of Rosario Central, prior to joining Olimpo in 2016. He was an unused substitute for Olimpo's final fixture of 2016 against Sarmiento on 21 May. In April 2017, Herranz made his professional debut versus Patronato, playing the full ninety minutes in a 3–4 victory. Following Olimpo's relegation in 2017–18, Herranz left to join Macedonian First Football League side Vardar on 5 July 2018. He left the club at the end of 2018.

Career statistics
.

References

External links

1994 births
Living people
People from Casilda
Argentine footballers
Association football defenders
Argentine expatriate footballers
Expatriate footballers in North Macedonia
Argentine expatriate sportspeople in North Macedonia
Argentine Primera División players
Macedonian First Football League players
Olimpo footballers
FK Vardar players
San Martín de San Juan footballers
Guillermo Brown de Puerto Madryn footballers
Sportspeople from Santa Fe Province